Malakwa is a settlement in Shuswap Country in the Southern Interior of British Columbia, Canada, in the Eagle River valley, along the Trans-Canada Highway between Sicamous and Revelstoke. It had a population of 649 people in 2001.

The name comes from the Chinook Jargon word for mosquito, adapted from the French le maringouin.

References
http://www.bcstats.gov.bc.ca/DATA/cen01/profiles/detailed/39043206.pdf
http://britishcolumbia.com/plan-your-trip/regions-and-towns/thompson-okanagan/malakwa/

Designated places in British Columbia
Unincorporated settlements in British Columbia
Shuswap Country
Populated places in the Columbia-Shuswap Regional District
Chinook Jargon place names